In enzymology, a taurine-pyruvate aminotransferase is an enzyme that catalyzes the chemical reaction.

taurine + pyruvate  L-alanine + 2-sulfoacetaldehyde

Thus, the two substrates of this enzyme are taurine and pyruvate, whereas its two products are L-alanine and 2-sulfoacetaldehyde.

This enzyme belongs to the family of transferases, specifically the transaminases, which transfer nitrogenous groups.  The systematic name of this enzyme class is taurine:pyruvate aminotransferase. This enzyme is also called Tpa.  This enzyme participates in taurine and hypotaurine metabolism.

References

 
 
 

EC 2.6.1
Enzymes of unknown structure